The Pepsi P1 and Pepsi P1S are Android smartphones manufactured by Koobee, an OEM, under licence from PepsiCo. and were only available through a crowdfunding campaign on Chinese crowdfunding site JD.com.

Software
The phone runs dido OS, which is a fork of Android that also ships preloaded on a number of Doogee phones (including the Y6 Max), but the P1 and P1S includes a Pepsi-themed skin by default instead of the standard dido OS skin that ships on Doogee phones.

References

Android (operating system) devices
PepsiCo